Michael Craig Bovee (born August 21, 1973) is a retired professional baseball player who played one season for the Anaheim Angels of Major League Baseball.

Sources
, or Retrosheet
Pura Pelota (Venezuelan Winter League)

1973 births
Living people
Baseball players from San Diego
American expatriate baseball players in Canada
Major League Baseball pitchers
Anaheim Angels players
Appleton Foxes players
Erie SeaWolves players
Gulf Coast Royals players
Midland Angels players
Rockford Royals players
Syracuse SkyChiefs players
Tiburones de La Guaira players
American expatriate baseball players in Venezuela
Vancouver Canadians players
Wichita Wranglers players
Wilmington Blue Rocks players